Glisezinski Lake is a lake in the U.S. state of Wisconsin.

The lake was named after the local Glisezinski family. Variant names are "Gleabiski Lake", "Glesbiki Lake", and "Lake Glesbiski". Glisezinski Lake is a 35 acre lake located in Portage County. It has a maximum depth of 11 feet.

References

Lakes of Wisconsin
Bodies of water of Portage County, Wisconsin